Abismos de amor (English: Depths of Love) is a Mexican telenovela created by Manuel Canseco Noriega for Telesistema Mexicano in 1961.

Cast 
 Luis Beristáin
 Virginia Gutiérrez
 Maruja Grifell
 Luis Manuel Pelayo
 Nicolás Rodríguez

References

External links 
 

Mexican telenovelas
1961 telenovelas
Televisa telenovelas
1961 Mexican television series debuts
1961 Mexican television series endings
Spanish-language telenovelas